The 2011 USA Indoor Track and Field Championships was held at Albuquerque Convention Center in Albuquerque, New Mexico. Organized by USA Track and Field (USATF), the two-day competition took place February 26–27 and served as the national championships in indoor track and field for the United States. The championships in combined track and field events were held two weeks later from March 5–6 at Gladstein Fieldhouse  at Indiana University Bloomington, Indiana.

Two American national records were set at the competition: Jenn Suhr cleared  in the pole vault and Jillian Camarena-Williams threw  in the shot put. Jenny Simpson completed a middle-distance double in the mile run and 3000 meters. Four athletes successfully defended their national titles from 2010: Bernard Lagat (3000 m), Jesse Williams (high jump), Camarena-Williams (shot put), Amber Campbell (weight throw).

Medal summary

Men

Women

References

Results
2011 USA Indoor Combined Events Championships Results. USATF. Retrieved 2019-06-13.
2011 USA Indoor Track & Field Championships Results. USATF. Retrieved 2019-06-13.

2011
Track and field indoor
USA Indoor Track and Field Championships
Sports in Albuquerque, New Mexico
Sports competitions in New Mexico
2011 in sports in New Mexico
Track and field in New Mexico
Events in Albuquerque, New Mexico